Mindjammer - The Roleplaying Game is a space opera role-playing game (RPG) created by Sarah Newton, published by Mindjammer Press in 2014, and distributed by Modiphius Entertainment.

Description
Mindjammer is set in the distant future, when humans have spread across the universe, and in some cases have evolved into Hominids, races with new abilities. Humans have also raised various animals to sentience (Xenomorphs), have created androids (Synthetics) to use as cheap labor, as well as sentient spaceships. Altogether, these are known as the Communality. In their explorations, humans have encountered a race dubbed the Venus, who have become the mortal enemies of the Communality.

The game uses the Fate System. Players can create player characters that can be anything from humans to hominids, xenomorphs, synthetics, aliens, or sentient spaceships. Characters are defined by traits that serve as modifiers for dice rolls.

Publication history
In 2008, Cubicle 7 Entertainment published a space opera RPG, Starblazer Adventures that used the FATE System. A year later, Sarah Newton created a background supplement titled Mindjammer. In March 2014, Cubicle 7 announced they would no longer publish or support the game as their licensing agreement had come to an end. Newton subsequently re-published Mindjammer as a standalone RPG later the same year. 

The first adventure supplement for the second edition, Hearts and Minds, was published in 2015. In November 2015, Mindjammer Press ran a successful Kickstarter campaign that funded a massive expansion of the line. By 2018, ten new supplements had been published, as well as a version of the game for use with Traveller.

Reception
Steve Dean of the British Fantasy Society was impressed, calling the second edition book "a solid chunk of SF goodness, printed on high-quality paper [...] The internal artwork is good but not intrusive and leaves plenty of room for the content." Dean concluded with a strong recommendation, saying, "Overall, this is an impressive volume of work. I would say it achieves everything it sets out to do, and does it with style, quality, and passion. Sarah Newton, and all her Newtonians, deserve a hearty round of applause. If I was giving out scores, this would be a perfect 10."

Other reviews and commentary
Freelance Traveller #54/55 (June/July 2014) and #89 (Sept-Oct 2018)
Le Maraudeur #15 (Dec 2014, in French)

Awards
 The first edition of Mindjammer won a Judges' Choice Award at the 2018 ENnie Awards.
 The second edition won a Griffie Award at the 2014 Conpulsion RPG convention, was a finalist for a 2014 Golden Geek RPG of the Year, and was nominated for two ENnies.

References

External links
Mindjammer: The Roleplaying Game - RPGnet RPG Game Index
Mindjammer: The Roleplaying Game (Second Edition)

ENnies winners
Science fiction role-playing games